The Empire Test Pilots' School (ETPS) is a British training school for test pilots and flight test engineers of fixed-wing and rotary-wing aircraft at MoD Boscombe Down in Wiltshire, England. It was established in 1943, the first of its type.  The school moved to RAF Cranfield in October 1945, then to the Royal Aircraft Establishment, Farnborough in July 1947, before returning to Boscombe Down on 29 January 1968.

Its motto is "Learn to test; test to learn".

ETPS is run by the MoD and defence contractor QinetiQ under a long-term agreement.

History
In 1943, Air Marshal Sir Ralph Sorley, Controller, Research and Development, MAP, formed the "Test Pilots' Training Flight" at RAF Boscombe Down after many pilots died testing the many new aircraft introduced during the Second World War.

On 21 June 1943, the unit became the Test Pilots' School within the Aeroplane and Armament Experimental Establishment (A&AEE) at Boscombe Down.  The school was "to provide suitably trained pilots for testing duties in aeronautical research and development establishments within the service and the industry".  It graduated one group of students, the Number 1 Course, which began in mid-1943 and formally ended on 29 February 1944, before the school's name was changed to the "Empire Test Pilots' School" (ETPS) on 28 July 1944.

The first training course, held by the Commandant, Wing Commander Samuel "Sammy" Wroath with G. Maclaren Humphreys, a civilian, as Technical Instructor, was initially attended by 18 pilots, drawn largely from the Royal Air Force (RAF) and the Fleet Air Arm of the Royal Navy but included three civilian attendees (all from the Bristol Aeroplane Company).  Five students found the standard of maths required on the course to be too high and left within the first week; the 13 students who completed the first course comprised 11 from the RAF (including one American, Sqn Ldr JC Nelson, who was serving with one of the Eagle Squadrons) and two from the FAA.  Of those who attended No. 1 Course, five eventually died testing aircraft.

Due to the rapid growth of the A&AEE, at Boscombe Down, the school moved to RAF Cranfield in October 1945. On 12 July 1947, it was attached to the Royal Aircraft Establishment, Farnborough, where it remained for almost 21 years, flying a wide variety of aircraft types, before returning to Boscombe Down on 29 January 1968.

Until 1963, the course catered to both fixed-wing and rotary-wing pilots, with the latter specializing late in the course. In 1963, a separate rotary-wing course was established, followed in 1974 by a course for Flight test engineers.  The school also offers a number of short courses "to meet specific Air Test and Evaluation (AT&E) training needs of the wider flight test community".

In 2001, ETPS was included with those research departments sold off by the Government to Carlyle Group during the formation of QinetiQ. It is now a partnership between QinetiQ and the UK MoD.

The Empire Test Pilots' School was the first of its kind, and was soon followed by other similar schools, such as the U.S. Air Force Test Pilot School at Edwards Air Force Base, California in 1944, the United States Naval Test Pilot School in Maryland in 1945 and the EPNER in France (École du Personnel Navigant d'Essais et de Réception) in 1946. Other schools in India (Indian Air Force Test Pilot School in Bangalore) and Japan were established in later years.  Some of these schools operate exchange programmes, which expand the variety of aircraft the students have available to them for gaining flight test experience.

In addition to such student exchanges, British, French and American schools share access to their aircraft, so that students can experience a wider range of aircraft types during their respective courses.

ETPS commandants

Commandants' names prior to 1968 from the ETPS 25th anniversary brochure; 1968–88, from Wing Commander "Robby" Robinson's "Tester Zero One". The term "Commandant" was succeeded in 1976 by "Chief Instructor" and in 1980 by "Officer Commanding".

Aircraft

As at 18 August 2019 ETPS uses the following types of aircraft:

ETPS graduates
ETPS graduates who have made significant contributions to aviation and/or space exploration.

To collapse the expanded table, click on "hide"; to expand the collapsed table, click on "show" in the Name column header.

Course trophies and awards
Recipients' names prior to 1968 are taken from the ETPS 25th anniversary brochure.

In the tables of trophy winners the following abbreviation are used in the course names:
 FW:  Fixed wing
 RW:  Rotary wing
 FTE: Flight test engineer

Legend
 The individual was killed in an aviation accident.

McKenna Trophy
In memory of the second Commandant of the School, Group Captain JFX McKenna, AFC, killed in a flying accident while serving in that post. Initially the school awarded the McKenna Trophy to the best fixed-wing student, but it is now open to the rotary-wing course as well.

To expand the collapsed table, click on "show" in the Year column header; to collapse again, choose "hide".

Edwards Trophy
This trophy is awarded by the Edwards Air Force Base in California to the student who makes the greatest progress on the course.

To expand the collapsed table, click on "show" in the Year column header; to collapse the expanded table, click on "hide".

Hawker Hunter Trophy
This trophy, a model of the Hawker Hunter, was first awarded in 1960 by the Hawker Aircraft Company to the student who wrote the best Preview Handling report on the course.  Since 1966 syndicates of two or three students have carried out the Preview Exercise; the trophy is awarded to the best team.

To expand the collapsed table, click on "show" in the Year column header; to collapse again, click on "hide".

Patuxent Shield
This trophy, instituted in 1961, is awarded by the U.S. Naval Test Pilot School, Patuxent River, to the runner-up for the McKenna Trophy.

To expand the collapsed table, click on "show" in the Year column header; to collapse again, click on "hide".

Westland Trophy
The Westland Trophy, originally presented by Westland Aircraft Limited in 1963, is awarded to the best all-round student on the Rotary Wing Course.

To expand the collapsed table, click on "show" in the Year column header; to collapse again, click on "hide".

Sir Alan Cobham Award
Presented to ETPS in 1974 by Michael Cobham, son of Sir Alan Cobham, this trophy is awarded to the fixed wing student who demonstrates the highest standard of flying during the course. The trophy is a silver model of a Short Singapore II flying-boat, which was originally awarded to Sir Alan and his wife in 1928 "in commemoration of their epic circuit of Africa flight in 1927 in such a flying-boat".

To expand the collapsed table, click on "show" in the Year column header; to collapse the expanded table, click on "hide".

Dunlop Trophy
The Dunlop Trophy, initially awarded by the Dunlop Rubber company in 1974, is awarded to the best student on each Flight Test Engineers' course.

To expand the collapsed table, click on "show" in the Year column header; to collapse the expanded table, click on "hide".

See also
List of test pilot schools
Rotary Wing Test Squadron
Boscombe Down

References

Notes

Citations

Bibliography
 , 68 pp.
 .
 .
 .
 .

External links

 
 .
  QinetiQ.
 .
 .  The Indian Air Force's flight evaluation and test training school, Bangalore.
 .
  on the purpose and practice of the ETPS.

Air force test units and formations
Educational institutions established in 1943
1943 establishments in England
Test pilot schools